This was the first edition of the women's event.

Nuria Párrizas Díaz won the title, defeating Wang Xinyu in the final, 7–6(7–2), 6–3.

Seeds

Draw

Finals

Top half

Bottom half

Qualifying

Seeds

Qualifiers

Lucky loser

Draw

First qualifier

Second qualifier

Third qualifier

Fourth qualifier

References

External Links
Main Draw
Qualifying Draw

Columbus Challenger
Columbus Challenger